Ryan George Lindley (born June 22, 1989) is an American football coach and former quarterback who is currently the offensive coordinator at San Diego State University. He played college football at San Diego State, and was drafted by the Arizona Cardinals in the sixth round of the 2012 NFL Draft. Lindley has also been a member of the San Diego Chargers, New England Patriots, Indianapolis Colts, and Ottawa Redblacks.

School career

High school
Lindley attended El Capitan High School in Lakeside, California. As a senior, he threw for 3,521 yards and 35 touchdowns.

College

After not playing in his first year on campus at San Diego State University in 2007 while Kevin O'Connell was the Aztecs' starter, Lindley started 11 games as a redshirt freshman in 2008. During the season, he completed 242 of 427 passes for 2,653 yards, 16 touchdowns and nine interceptions. As a sophomore in 2009 he started 12 games and completed 239 of 437 passes for 3,054 yards with 23 touchdowns and 16 interceptions. As a junior in 2010 Lindley completed 243 of 421 passes for 3,830 yards, 28 touchdowns and 14 interceptions. He helped lead the Aztecs to the 2010 Poinsettia Bowl, their first Bowl game since the 1998 Las Vegas Bowl. He helped them defeat the Navy Midshipmen 35 to 14 after completing 18 of 23 passes for 276 yards and two touchdowns.

Statistics

Professional career

Arizona Cardinals 
Lindley was drafted in the sixth round of the 2012 NFL Draft by the Arizona Cardinals. On November 18, 2012, he replaced John Skelton in a loss to the Atlanta Falcons. He made his first professional start on November 25 against the St. Louis Rams. In his first season, he posted a very low 46.7 passer rating and threw 7 interceptions compared to 0 touchdowns. After two seasons with the team, Lindley was released by the Cardinals on August 25, 2014.

San Diego Chargers 
Lindley signed with the San Diego Chargers and was assigned to their practice squad on August 31, 2014.

Arizona Cardinals (second stint) 
On November 11, 2014, Lindley re-signed with the Arizona Cardinals after a season-ending injury to Carson Palmer. On December 11, 2014, starting quarterback Drew Stanton was injured in the game against the St. Louis Rams, Lindley entered the game and saw his first in-game action since 2012. On December 28, 2014, against the San Francisco 49ers, Lindley threw his first career touchdown pass to Michael Floyd, ending an NFL-record 228 pass attempts without a touchdown to start his career. He finished the 2014 season with a 48.4% completion rate, 562 yards passing, 2 touchdowns, 4 interceptions, and a 56.8 passer rating.

On January 3, 2015, in the Cardinals' first-round playoff game at the Carolina Panthers, Lindley completed 16 of 28 passes for 82 yards, one touchdown and two interceptions. He had a passer rating of 44.3 and Arizona lost 27–16. The Cardinals totaled 78 yards of offense, the fewest in NFL playoff history.

New England Patriots 
On August 10, 2015, Lindley agreed to terms with the New England Patriots. On September 5, 2015, the Patriots released Lindley after the last preseason game.

Indianapolis Colts 
On December 29, 2015, Lindley signed with the Indianapolis Colts. On January 3, 2016, Lindley split time with fellow recent signee Josh Freeman in the Colts season finale against the Tennessee Titans  and went 6/10 for 58 yards and a touchdown in the 30–24 win.

Canadian Football League

Ottawa Redblacks
After not playing professional football for more than a year, Lindley signed with the Ottawa Redblacks of the Canadian Football League (CFL) on February 2, 2017. Lindley saw the most action during the preseason for the Redblacks; he completed 18 of 30 pass attempts for 140 yards with 1 touchdown and 0 interceptions. Lindley made his first CFL start on September 22, 2017: Starting quarterback Trevor Harris and backup Drew Tate were both out with injuries. Lindley played very poorly, completing just 16 of 36 pass attempts (44.4%) for only 151 yards (4.2 yards per attempt), with one interception and the Redblacks were beaten handily by the Blue Bombers 29–9. Lindley was not much better in the team's next match against the Saskatchewan Roughriders, completing 17 of 31 pass attempts (54.8%) for 161 yards (5.2 yards per attempt), with one touchdown and one interception. On March 6, 2018 Lindley was released by the Redblacks.

Career statistics

Coaching career

San Diego State
Lindley was a graduate assistant at his alma mater, San Diego State from 2017 through October 31, 2018.

Cleveland Browns
Lindley was hired as the running backs coach for the Cleveland Browns on October 31, 2018, after running backs coach Freddie Kitchens was promoted to offensive coordinator. On January 14, 2019, he was named the Browns' quarterbacks coach.

Utah
In 2020 Lindley worked as an offensive analyst for Utah.

Mississippi State
In 2021 Lindley joined Mississippi State as a defensive analyst.

San Diego State (second stint)
Lindley was named the quarterbacks coach at San Diego State on October 2, 2022.

Personal life
After being released by the Colts, Lindley's agent, Rep 1 Sports, hired him as a coach. He was tasked with getting Carson Wentz and Jared Goff ready for their NFL Combine and Pro Day performances. In 2014, Lindley was a stand-in body double for Andrew Luck in a Visa commercial that featured Cardinals teammate Larry Fitzgerald. The commercial also featured Drew Brees and Colin Kaepernick through CGI. At San Diego State University, Lindley majored in Social Science Teaching.

See also
 List of Division I FBS passing yardage leaders

References

External links

 
 
 

1989 births
Living people
Players of Canadian football from San Diego
Players of American football from San Diego
Coaches of American football from California
American football quarterbacks
Canadian football quarterbacks
American players of Canadian football
San Diego State Aztecs football players
Arizona Cardinals players
San Diego Chargers players
New England Patriots players
Indianapolis Colts players
Ottawa Redblacks players
San Diego State Aztecs football coaches
Cleveland Browns coaches
Utah Utes football coaches
Mississippi State Bulldogs football coaches